The Mines of Keridav is a 1979 fantasy role-playing game adventure published by Phoenix Games.

Plot summary
The Mines of Keridav is an adventure designed to be used with almost any fantasy role-playing system, including Chivalry & Sorcery, RuneQuest, and Dungeons & Dragons.  The player characters attempt to travel through the valley of Tiraval to rescue the Princess from the evil wizard Keridav.

Publication history
The Mines of Keridav was written by Kerry Lloyd, with a cover by Bob Charrette, and was published by Phoenix Games in 1979 as a 24-page book; a second edition was published by Gamelords in 1983 as a 28-page book including statistics for Thieves' Guild.

Reception
Richard A. Edwards reviewed The Mines of Keridav in The Space Gamer No. 33. Edwards commented that "The Mines of Keridav is a step forward. No longer must other FRP systems adapt D&D-oriented material to theirs.  The heavy emphasis on the above-ground adventure is a real bonus over the now-prolific use of underground room to room scenarios. This is a real bonus to any game master's library of adventures."

Reviews
 Different Worlds #35 (July/Aug., 1984)

References

Fantasy role-playing game adventures
Role-playing game supplements introduced in 1979